Edward Childs Carpenter (1872–1950) was an American writer of novels and plays and a stage director in the early through mid-20th century.

Biography
Carpenter was born December 13, 1872 (1874 per his gravestone) at Philadelphia, Pennsylvania, a son of Edward Payson and Frances Bradley "Fanny" (née Childs) Carpenter, of the New England Rehoboth Carpenter family.

After leaving school, Carpenter became a newspaperman and quickly rose to the position of financial editor at The Philadelphia Inquirer.  In 1903 he published his first novel, The Chasm, co-authored with Reginald Wright Kauffman, which received favorable reviews.
On June 1, 1907, Carpenter married the illustrator Helen Alden Knipe; later they collaborated as writers. 

Carpenter began writing plays while working at the Inquirer from 1905 to 1916, beginning with The Dragon Fly in 1905 (with Luther Long), followed by a dramatization of his own 1906 novel Captain Courtesy, which was later made into a silent film of the same title, Captain Courtesy.  His longest-running plays were The Cinderella Man in 1916, with 192 performances, The Bachelor Father in 1928, with 264 performances (later made into a film, The Bachelor Father), and Whistling in the Dark, co-authored with Laurence Gross, in 1932, with 144 performances (also later made into a film, Whistling in the Dark).

From 1924 to 1927, Carpenter was president of the Dramatists' Theatre, Inc. In 1922, he became the second elected president of the Dramatists Guild of America. He was re-elected in 1929 continuing on as the Guild's fifth president until 1935.  He was a member of the Franklin Inn Club in Philadelphia, and The Players and The Lambs clubs in New York City.

Carpenter died in Torrington, Connecticut on October 7, 1950. He and his wife, writer and illustrator Helen Alden (née Knipe) Carpenter, are interred in Town Hill Cemetery in New Hartford, Connecticut.

Works

References

External links

1872 births
1950 deaths
American male novelists
20th-century American male writers
20th-century American novelists
Writers from Philadelphia
Novelists from Pennsylvania